"Life in a Day" was (until the release of "Over My Shoulder") I Am Kloot's highest charting single coming in at #43 in the UK singles chart in 2003. The second CD featured the music video for "Life in a Day" as well as 2 other B-sides.

Release
"Life in a Day" first appeared on I Am Kloot's self-titled second album. Preceded by "Untitled #1" which was released in March 2003, the track was the second single from the album and released on 9 June 2003. It peaked at #45 in the UK singles chart.

Music video

The music video for "Life in a Day" was directed by film, multimedia, and transmedia artist Krishna Stott (Crimeface, Secret Story Network), and was the first of a number of collaborations between I Am Kloot and Stott. 

City Life journalist Tim Birch described the video as 'a montage of cuts' that 'unfold' thus 'providing a non-story leading nowhere that strangely holds attention'. Composed of hundreds of fake security camera clips, Stott said of the project 'I like working with Kloot [...] they give me a lot of freedom visually'.

Stott went on to make the music video for I Am Kloot's single "Proof" (a nearly three minute long take of British actor Christopher Eccleston), and "From Your Favourite Sky", both from the same album. Both "Life in a Day" and "From Your Favourite Sky" videos are available on I Am Kloot's Gods and Monsters DVD (2005).

Track listing
The single was released on three formats, two CDs and one 7" single. All songs written by John Harold Arnold Bramwell.

CD one
"Life in a Day"  – 2:48
"This House Is Haunted"  – 4:14
"Cinders"  – 1:57

CD two
"Life in a Day"  – 2:48
"Deep Blue Sea"  – 3:54
"By Myself"  – 2:59

7 inch vinyl 
"Life in a Day"  – 2:48
"This House Is Haunted"  – 4:14

References

2003 singles
I Am Kloot songs
Song recordings produced by Ian Broudie